Borislav Jovanović (Cyrillic: Борислав Јовановић, born 1941 in Danilovgrad), Montenegrin writer, poet, author essays and literary critic.

During the 1990s and later Jovanovic, as well as the influential columnist for the daily newspaper Pobjeda, pleiad young Montenegrin writers. These and other books he wrote about 200 bibliographic units.

Considered to be "the most important interpreter of recent trends Montenegrin literary practices", while "Jovanovic collection of essays titled  'The Montenegrin literary urbanity', certainly, to date, is qualified and out of Montenegro most quoted literary critical view of the Montenegrin new, primarily urban literature".

He was an active participant in a sharp public struggle for constitutional recognition of Montenegrin language as the mother tongue Montenegrins.

His literary works have contributed to the modern understanding kulturng and political heritage of the Montenegrins. His work on this problem are mostly consolidated in the books "Libroskopija" (2002) and "Montenegrin literary urbanity" (2005).

Shortened version of the introductory text for the book "Montenegrin literary urbanity" was released as a preface the book "Sons – view of contemporary fiction Montenegro" which is 2006 was published in published Antibarbarus from Zagreb, the Plima from Ulcinj and the association of Sa(n)jam knjige from Pula.

The text of the author "New Montenegrin novel – deconstruction, personal poetics, discontinuity" was published in the latest book "Voices of the Montenegrin fiction: literary – historical election and view"(Osijek-Cetinje 2007) in the co-author Dr. Milorad Nikčević and Dr. Jakov Sabljić, professor of Osijek University (Croatia).

Jovanovic graduated from the University of Belgrade Faculty of Philology. He is a member of the Montenegrin society independent writer and Matica crnogorska.

As a poet, Jovanovic winner Ratkovic awards, largest Montenegrin recognition in the field of poetry for his collection of poems "Kenotaf".

He is the author and several collections of poems for children.

More important works
"The Old Man and the stars" (1979)
"Paths" (1983)
"Amputation" (2001)
"Libroskopija: Views from the modern Montenegrin literature and historiography" (2002)
"Montenegrin literary urbanity" (2005)
"Biblion:Montenegrin poetry of the nineties" (2006)
"Kenotaf" (2006)
"Spornik" (2009)
"Capture Thanatos" (2010)
"The White Raven" (2012)

External links
 Borislav Jovanović living this "Victory"

Sources

1941 births
Living people
People from Danilovgrad
Montenegrin poets
Montenegrin male writers
Montenegrin children's writers
University of Belgrade Faculty of Philology alumni